Elspeth Denning (OAM) (née Swain, also known as Elspeth Denning-Clement and Elspeth Clement-Denning) a former Western Australian field hockey player.  She was born in Kenya on 19 June 1956 and moved with her family to South Africa when she was six.  She played representative hockey for Western Province before moving to Western Australia in 1975.

As a member of the Hockeyroos, she represented Australian in 101 matches between 1978 and 1988.  She was selected for Olympic squads in 1980 (Moscow), 1984 (Los Angeles) and 1988 (Seoul).  In 1988 she was vice-captain in Australia's gold medal win, and was rated as the outstanding player of the meet.

In domestic hockey, Denning represented Western Australia from 1976 to 1988.

Awards
In 1989 she was awarded the Order of Australia medal and was voted Western Australian Sports Star of the Year.

In 1996 she was inducted into the Western Australian Hall of Champions.

in 2005 she was inducted into the Hockey WA Hall of Champions

References

External links
 

1956 births
Australian female field hockey players
Australian people of British descent
Kenyan emigrants to Australia
White Kenyan people
White South African people
Field hockey players from Perth, Western Australia
Olympic field hockey players of Australia
Field hockey players at the 1988 Summer Olympics
Olympic gold medalists for Australia
Olympic medalists in field hockey
Living people
Medalists at the 1988 Summer Olympics